Cartridge number 1 in the official Philips line of games for the Philips Videopac contains three games: Race, Spin-out, and Cryptogram. In the United States, it was distributed for the Magnavox Odyssey²  as Speedway / Spin-out / Cryptologic.

Gameplay

Race
Race is a fairly simple game where you control a car travelling on an infinite straight stretch of road. You start from a standstill, and move the stick up to accelerate, down to decelerate, right and left move the car sideways. The object is to keep driving for as long as possible, without crashing into any of the other cars. If you ever slow to a stop then your car gets run over.

Spin-out
Spin-out is a two-player game, in which each player controls a car around a loop of racetrack. The winner is the one who completes three or fifteen laps the fastest, there are time penalties for crashing into a wall or spinning when hit by the other car.

Cryptogram
Cryptogram is also for two players, one types in a message of up to fourteen characters, then hits enter to scramble it. The other player types in what they think it is, and loses points for each incorrect letter, in a similar fashion to hangman.

Reception
The cartridge was reviewed by Video magazine in its "Arcade Alley" column where it was praised as "a good showcase for the [Odyssey²]'s capabilities" whose varied gameplay is "well calculated to whet the arcade addict's appetite for more". The three constituent games were reviewed individually as well with Speedway receiving faint criticism for its overly easy slow speed setting, Spin-Out being described as "best with two players", and Crypto-logic praised as "an easy way for parents to help their school-age children with spelling."

References
Race - Spin-out - Cryptogram at GameFAQs

1978 video games
Multiplayer video games
Racing video games
Magnavox Odyssey 2 games
Video game compilations
Video games developed in the United States
Word puzzle video games